Linda Whittington (born November 23, 1950) is an American politician who served as a member of the Mississippi House of Representatives for the 34th district from 2008 to 2016. She is a member of the Democratic party.

References

1950 births
Living people
Democratic Party members of the Mississippi House of Representatives
Women state legislators in Mississippi
People from Charleston, Mississippi
21st-century American politicians
21st-century American women politicians